Edgar Bischoff (May 20, 1912  – December 27, 1995), also known by the alias Francis Mainville, was a Romanian-born French composer and lyricist.

Biography
Bischoff was born in Ploiești, Romania, the son of Louise (née Schapira) and Léon Bischoff. He studied in the Royal Academy of Music and Dramatic Art in Bucharest and then in the École Normale de Musique de Paris, after which he remained in France. In 1949 he wrote the film score of Le Silence de la mer and later for movies such as mime artist Marcel Marceau's Der Mantel ("Le Manteau", based on Gogol's "The Overcoat").
He continued writing stage music, television and film score to the end of the 1970s. He died in the Paris suburb of Draveil in 1995, aged 83.

References

External links

 Edgar Bischoff: photographs from 1959, on akg-images

1912 births
1995 deaths
French male composers
20th-century French composers
French musical theatre composers
French film score composers
French lyricists
20th-century French male musicians
Romanian emigrants to France